Shayne Makombe (born 21 November 1991) is a Zimbabwe rugby union player, currently playing for the  in the 2022 Currie Cup First Division. His preferred position is wing.

Professional career
Makombe was named in the  squad for the 2022 Currie Cup First Division. He is a Zimbabwean international in both 15-a-side and sevens.

References

External links
itsrugby.co.uk Profile

1991 births
Living people
Rugby union wings
Zimbabwean rugby union players
Zimbabwe international rugby union players
Zimbabwe Goshawks players